Multnomah County Sheriff's Office Search and Rescue (MCSO SAR) is a non-profit volunteer search and rescue resource for the Multnomah County Sheriff's Office in Multnomah County, Oregon, United States. The agency also offers its 3,000-5,000 hours of volunteer service to other areas, including Clackamas, Columbia, Washington, Marion, Hood River, Wasco, Tillamook, and Clatsop counties in Oregon, and Skamania and Clark counties in Washington. The organization was first created in 1961 in cooperation with the Boy Scouts of America, and is one of the longest continually used Explorer Search and Rescue units in the United States. In 1986, sponsorship of the MCSO SAR was transferred to the Multnomah County Sheriff's Office.
MCSO SAR is part of the Mount Hood Search and Rescue Council. MCSO receives funding from the Department of Homeland Security within the Urban Area Security Initiative (UASI) to create a regional resource.

History 

MCSO SAR was founded by a parent interested in forming a Boy Scout bagpiper crew. The troop was only open to males and had 12 members. At the time the troop had no interest in performing search and rescue tasks, but in 1961 it was called upon to do so by Multnomah County after all of their law enforcement staff were exhausted during a search on Mount Hood. The group agreed to assist with the search and were later asked to partner with Multnomah County Sheriff's Office (MCSO) as a volunteer search and rescue resource. Once the unit was officially affiliated with the county, it began offering membership to women and slowly gained female members. Years later, after the Boy Scout affiliation faded, the sheriff's office began affiliating the unit as the primary search and rescue resource for Multnomah County.

Training 
All members of MCSO SAR are trained in a wide range of fields, including first aid, the legal aspect of search and rescue, emergency survival skills and equipment, radio communications, land navigation, GPS orientation, crime scene safety and security, search organization and management, search techniques, man tracking, helicopter safety, wilderness medicine, and rescue techniques.  A minimum of 40 hours of training each year is required by the state; however, MCSO SAR itself requires 200 hours.

This extra training required by the MCSO SAR includes rope rescue training, rope systems, and pulley systems, urban search and rescue scenarios, training in responding to terrorist attacks, natural disasters and urban searches, crime scene evidence searching, and snow and avalanche safety.  MCSO SAR also participates in the Washington State Search & Rescue Conference each year for specialist training in a number of different subjects.  Starting in the summer of 2007, MCSO SAR began optional training which consisted of review as well as specialized training such as high rope rescue, advanced first aid, advanced survival skills, and helicopter training.

Services 

The MCSO SAR provides a number of services to Multnomah County, Oregon.  Its members are the main first response team for missing, lost, or injured persons in the county and are often called in by other counties to assist at large search sites or when resources are drained.  MCSO SAR members also often perform crime scene evidence searches at major or outdoor crime scenes for agencies all over the state of Oregon and have been credited with finding key evidence that ultimately assisted in solving hundreds of homicides. Besides responding to emergencies, MCSO SAR members often assist with or put on public safety events to inform and teach the public about outdoor safety. MCSO SAR also works at various public events, assisting with such things as security, parking/traffic, and first aid.

Command Structure 
Multnomah County Sheriff's Office Search and Rescue members make up various positions within the unit. Each of those positions has different roles and responsibilities, with greater or lesser authority.

Law Enforcement Staff
Sheriff
Chief Deputy
Captain
Sergeant (Head SAR Coordinator)
Deputy (multiple Associate SAR Coordinators)

Volunteers
Advisor
Unit President
Unit Vice President
Quartermaster
Secretary
Team Leader (TL)
Assistant Team Leader (ATL)
Reserve
Certified Team Member (certification through the State of Oregon)
Uncertified Team Member

Membership 
There are certain requirements to join MCSO Search and Rescue team, these being:
 Desire to serve the community
 14 years of age or older
 If in school, must maintain a Grade point average of 2.5 or higher
 Able to pass a criminal background check
 Have up-to-date vaccinations
 Physical fitness: operating on foot and hike for long periods of time
 Maintain a minimum amount of required outdoor equipment and clothing
 On call 24/7
 Pass a state certification exam

Other agencies 
There are a number of other agencies that assist with searches within Multnomah County, including:
 Portland Mountain Rescue (PMR)
 American Medical Response Reach & Treat Team (AMR RAT team) 
 Pacific Northwest Search & Rescue (PNW SAR)
 Mountain Wave, who assist with communications and radio.
 AMR River Rescue
 Search-One K9.
 Washington County Explorer Search and Rescue
 Clackamas county Search and Rescue
 Mount Hood Craig RATS
 Coast Guard
 Civil Air Patrol (CAP)

See also
 List of law enforcement agencies in Oregon
 Multnomah County Sheriff's Office

References

External links 
  Multnomah County Sheriff's Office Search and Rescue homepage
  Multnomah County Sheriff's Office
 Multnomah County Emergency Management

Multnomah County, Oregon
Rescue agencies
Sheriffs' offices of Oregon
1961 establishments in Oregon